This is a list of the Austrian Singles Chart number-one hits of 1990.

See also
1990 in music

References

1990 in Austria
1990 record charts
Lists of number-one songs in Austria